Birkdale Palace railway station was located in Birkdale, Lancashire, England. The station was opened by the Southport & Cheshire Lines Extension Railway in 1884 and closed in 1952.

History
The Southport & Cheshire Lines Extension Railway (SCLER) opened Birkdale Palace on 1 September 1884, as an intermediate station from Southport Lord Street railway station. The station was built adjacent to a hotel called the Birkdale Palace Hotel (now closed and demolished) and was sandwiched between Palace Road & Weld Roads.

The station was an island platform, accessed from the Weld Road bridge. It first closed on 1 January 1917, along with all other stations on the extension line, as a World War I economy measure.

The station was reopened on 1 April 1919, and continued in use until 7 January 1952, when the SCLER was closed to passengers from Aintree Central to Southport Lord Street. Until 7 July 1952 the line remained open for public goods traffic at Southport Lord Street, Birkdale Palace and Altcar & Hillhouse stations. Public goods facilities were closed at Woodvale, Lydiate and Sefton & Maghull stations on the same date as passenger services, and goods facilities were never provided at Ainsdale Beach station. After 7 July 1952, a siding remained open at Altcar & Hillhouse for private goods traffic until May 1960. The last passenger train to run on the SCLER was a railway enthusiasts 'special' between Aintree and Altcar & Hillhouse railways stations on 6 June 1959.

On the subject of railway station or line 'closing dates', the official day of a closure is always given as the Monday following the date the last train ran. As this is almost always a Saturday, if Monday 7 January 1952 is given as the date of closure, the actual last day of services was Saturday, 5 January 1952. This is proven by last day tickets which bear the 5 January date.

After closure
Later the route of the line was converted into what is now Coastal Road, which runs from Woodvale to Southport, although at the site of Birkdale Palace station the road alignment runs to the west of the former trackbed.

References

Sources

Further reading
 Encyclopedia of British Railway Companies, Christopher Awdry, 1990, Guild Publishing, CN 8983.

External links
 The station on a 1948 OS Map via npe maps
 The station's history via Disused Stations UK
 Special trains via sixbellsjunction
 The station and line via railwaycodes

Disused railway stations in the Metropolitan Borough of Sefton
Former Cheshire Lines Committee stations
Railway stations in Great Britain opened in 1884
Railway stations in Great Britain closed in 1917
Railway stations in Great Britain opened in 1919
Railway stations in Great Britain closed in 1952
Buildings and structures in Southport